Fort McKay or Fort MacKay is a community in northeast Alberta, Canada that is located at the confluence of the Athabasca and MacKay rivers.

The majority of the community is an Indian settlement of the Fort McKay First Nation (FMFN). The smaller portion of the community, known as Fort MacKay before 2018, is located adjacent to the FMFN lands to the south within the Regional Municipality (RM) of Wood Buffalo. The portion of the community within the RM of Wood Buffalo is designated as a hamlet.

History 

The community was named in 1912 after Dr. Williams Morrison MacKay, the first president of the Northern Alberta Medical Association. The community's name is spelled Fort McKay by the Fort McKay First Nation. In August 2012, the Fort McKay Métis Community requested the RM of Wood Buffalo to change the name of the hamlet to Fort McKay. The change was recognized by the RM on January 22, 2018.

2016 wildfire
Fort McKay hosted 5000 evacuees from the 2016 Fort McMurray Wildfire but itself was put under an evacuation notice due to the northward advance of the flames toward the community.

Geography 
Climate
Fort McKay has a subarctic climate (Köppen climate classification Dfc). and falls into the NRC Plant Hardiness Zone 3a. Summers are mild and short, and winters can be long and cold.

Demographics 

Settlement
In the 2016 Census of Population conducted by Statistics Canada, the Fort McKay settlement recorded a population of 742 living in 250 of its 303 total private dwellings, a  change from its 2011 population of 562.

In the 2011 Census, the Fort McKay settlement had a population of 562 living in 201 of its 235 total dwellings, a 7.9% change from its 2006 population of 521.

Hamlet
The population of the hamlet portion of Fort McKay according to the 2018 municipal census conducted by the Regional Municipality of Wood Buffalo is 59, an increase from its 2015 municipal census population count of 51.

Economy 
The economy is centred on the development of the Athabasca oil sands to the immediate south and north. Motorists travelling north on Highway 63 pass through oil sands developments en route to the community.

Government 
The community is located in the federal riding of Fort McMurray—Cold Lake.
<mapframe
text="Fort McKay, Alberta"
width=250
height=250
zoom=8
latitude=57.1811111
longitude=-111.5997222/>

Infrastructure 

See also 
List of communities in Alberta
List of hamlets in Alberta

References

External links 

Fort McKay

Hamlets in Alberta
Regional Municipality of Wood Buffalo
Hudson's Bay Company forts